FIRS may refer to:

Federal Inland Revenue Service, the federal tax administrator in Nigeria
Fédération Internationale de Roller Sports, the International Federation of Roller Sports
FIRS (index), a share index of the Banja Luka Stock Exchange
Forensic Investigation Research Station, a "body farm" at Colorado Mesa University
Forum of International Respiratory Societies, a respiratory health advocacy organization

See also
 FIR (disambiguation)
The Firs (disambiguation)